Léon Deyron (20 February 1874 - 3 March 1947) was a French politician.

Deyron was born in Constantine, Algeria.  He represented the Radical Party in the Constituent Assembly elected in 1945.

References

1874 births
1947 deaths
People from Constantine, Algeria
Radical Party (France) politicians
Members of the Constituent Assembly of France (1945)
French people in French Algeria